Remigio of Florence can refer to two people:
 Remigio dei Girolami (1235–1319), an Italian Dominican theologian
 Remigio Nannini (1518/1521 – 1580), an Italian Dominican scholar and editor